South River High School may refer to:

South River High School (Maryland) in Edgewater, Maryland
South River High School (New Jersey) in South River, New Jersey